Daniel Richard "Boo" Buie (born December 7, 1999) is an American college basketball player for the Northwestern Wildcats of the Big Ten Conference.

Early life and high school
Buie grew up in Albany, New York and initially attended Troy High School. He transferred to Gould Academy in Bethel, Maine after his sophomore year. Buie averaged 27 points, six rebounds, five assists, and three steals per game in his first season at Gould. Buie committed to play college basketball at Northwestern over offers from St. Bonaventure, UMass, Boston University, and Siena.

College career
Buie played in 26 games with 11 starts during his freshman season at Northwestern, averaging 10.3 points per game and finishing second on the team with 63 assists and 17 steals. He averaged 10.3 points per game as a sophomore and led the Wildcats with team with 41 made three-pointers made and 96 assists. Buie averaged 14.1 points, 4.3 assists, and 2.5 rebounds per game during his junior season. As a senior, he was named first team All-Big Ten Conference and to the second team by the league's coaches.

Personal life
Buie's half-brother, Talor Battle, played college basketball at Penn State and professionally overseas. Talor Battle is currently an assistant on Northwestern's coaching staff.

References

External links
Northwestern Wildcats bio

Living people
American men's basketball players
Basketball players from New York (state)
Northwestern Wildcats men's basketball players
Point guards
Sportspeople from Albany, New York